The 2017 North Rhine-Westphalia state election was held on 14 May 2017 to elect the members of the Landtag of North Rhine-Westphalia. The incumbent coalition government of the Social Democratic Party (SPD) and The Greens led by Minister-President Hannelore Kraft was defeated. The Christian Democratic Union (CDU) became the largest party and formed a coalition with the Free Democratic Party (FDP). CDU leader Armin Laschet was subsequently elected Minister-President.

This election was the last election in which an incumbent Minister-President was defeated until the 2022 Saarland state election.

Parties

The table below lists parties represented in the previous Landtag of North Rhine-Westphalia.

Opinion polling

Party polling

Minister-President polling

Results
The CDU became the largest party with 33% of the vote. The governing SPD and Greens suffered a 13-point swing between them, the latter losing half their seats. The FDP achieved their best ever result in the state at 12.6%, and AfD debuted at 7.4%. The Pirates collapsed to just 1% of the vote and were ousted from the Landtag. The Left doubled their vote share to 4.9%, but fell just short of the threshold.

References

2017 elections in Germany
2017
May 2017 events in Germany